The Bonavista Formation is an Early Cambrian formation which is exposed in outcrop in Newfoundland. The unit is dominated by red mudstone, with some purple-green mudstones, and the occasional interbedded nodular limestone. A gritty conglomerate is exposed at the base of the unit.

References

Stratigraphy of Canada